The 1946–47 SK Rapid Wien season was the 49th season in club history.

Squad

Squad and statistics

Squad statistics

Fixtures and results

League

Cup

References

1946-47 Rapid Wien Season
Rapid